The 2017–18 UEFA Champions League knockout phase began on 13 February and ended on 26 May 2018 with the final at the NSC Olimpiyskiy Stadium in Kyiv, Ukraine, to decide the champions of the 2017–18 UEFA Champions League. A total of 16 teams competed in the knockout phase.

Times are CET/CEST, as listed by UEFA (local times are in parentheses).

Round and draw dates
The schedule of the knockout phase was as follows (all draws were held at the UEFA headquarters in Nyon, Switzerland).

Format
The knockout phase involved the 16 teams which qualified as winners and runners-up of each of the eight groups in the group stage.

Each tie in the knockout phase, apart from the final, was played over two legs, with each team playing one leg at home. The team that scored more goals on aggregate over the two legs advanced to the next round. If the aggregate score was level, the away goals rule was applied, i.e. the team that scored more goals away from home over the two legs advanced. If away goals were also equal, then thirty minutes of extra time were played. The away goals rule was again applied after extra time, i.e. if there were goals scored during extra time and the aggregate score was still level, the visiting team advanced by virtue of more away goals scored. If no goals were scored during extra time, the tie was decided by penalty shoot-out. In the final, which was played as a single match, if scores were level at the end of normal time, extra time was played, followed by a penalty shoot-out if scores remained tied.

The mechanism of the draws for each round was as follows:
In the draw for the round of 16, the eight group winners were seeded, and the eight group runners-up were unseeded. The seeded teams were drawn against the unseeded teams, with the seeded teams hosting the second leg. Teams from the same group or the same association could not be drawn against each other.
In the draws for the quarter-finals onwards, there were no seedings, and teams from the same group or the same association could be drawn against each other.

Qualified teams

Bracket

Round of 16

The draw for the round of 16 was held on 11 December 2017, 12:00 CET.

With five English teams in the round of 16, this was the first time five teams from one association qualified for the Champions League knockout phase.

Summary

The first legs were played on 13, 14, 20 and 21 February, and the second legs were played on 6, 7, 13 and 14 March 2018.

|}

Matches

Juventus won 4–3 on aggregate.

Manchester City won 5–2 on aggregate.

Liverpool won 5–0 on aggregate.

Sevilla won 2–1 on aggregate.

Real Madrid won 5–2 on aggregate.

2–2 on aggregate. Roma won on away goals.

Barcelona won 4–1 on aggregate.

Bayern Munich won 8–1 on aggregate.

Quarter-finals

The draw for the quarter-finals was held on 16 March 2018, 12:00 CET.

Summary

The first legs were played on 3 and 4 April, and the second legs were played on 10 and 11 April 2018.

|}

Matches

4–4 on aggregate. Roma won on away goals.

Bayern Munich won 2–1 on aggregate.

Real Madrid won 4–3 on aggregate.

Liverpool won 5–1 on aggregate.

Semi-finals

The draw for the semi-finals was held on 13 April 2018, 13:00 CEST.

For the first time since the 2009–10 UEFA Champions League, all the four teams at this stage represent different national associations.

Summary

The first legs were played on 24 and 25 April, and the second legs were played on 1 and 2 May 2018.

|}

Matches

Real Madrid won 4–3 on aggregate.

Liverpool won 7–6 on aggregate.

Final

The final was played at the NSC Olimpiyskiy Stadium in Kyiv on 26 May 2018. The "home" team (for administrative purposes) was determined by an additional draw held after the semi-final draw.

Notes

References

External links
UEFA Champions League (official website)
UEFA Champions League history: 2017/18

Knockout Phase
2017-18
February 2018 sports events in Europe
March 2018 sports events in Europe
April 2018 sports events in Europe
May 2018 sports events in Europe